Niphona javana is a species of beetle in the family Cerambycidae. It was described by Franz in 1971. It is known from Java.

References

javana
Beetles described in 1971